Joe Young (July 4, 1889 – April 21, 1939) was an American lyricist. He was born in New York. Young was most active from 1911 through the late-1930s, beginning his career working as a singer and song-plugger for various music publishers. During World War I, he entertained the U.S. troops, touring Europe as a singer.

Works
An early work is the song "Way Down East" (©1910) words by Cecil Mack, music by Joe Young and Harold Norman, published by Gotham-Attucks Music Publishing Company.

The Laugh Parade
For the 1931 Broadway show The Laugh Parade, Young collaborated with co-lyricist Mort Dixon and composer Harry Warren on "You're My Everything". The show also included:
 "Ooh! That Kiss"
 "Love Me Forever"
 "That Torch Song"

Later efforts
 "In a Shanty in Old Shanty Town"
 "Lullaby of the Leaves"
 "Snuggled On Your Shoulder, Cuddled In Your Arms"
 "Was That the Human Thing To Do?"
 "Something in the Night"
 "Annie Doesn't Live Here Anymore"
 "I'm Growing Fonder of You"
 "You're a Heavenly Thing"
 "Sing an Old Fashioned Song"
 "Dancing with You"
 "Just a Baby's Prayer at Twilight (For Her Daddy Over There)"
 "Whistle and Blow Your Blues Away"

His last work was the famous standard "I'm Gonna Sit Right Down and Write Myself a Letter", written with Fred Ahlert in 1935.

Joe Young died in New York. He was inducted into the Songwriters Hall of Fame in 1970.

References

External links
Joe Young's entry at the Songwriters' Hall of Fame

Joe Young recordings at the Discography of American Historical Recordings.

1889 births
1939 deaths
Songwriters from New York (state)
Musicians from New York City